Bulle can refer to:

 Bulle, Fribourg, Switzerland
 FC Bulle, based in the Swiss town
 Bulle, Doubs, France
 Heinrich Bulle (1867-1945), German archeologist
 Bulle, a Finnish rapper (real name Joni "Big" Bollström)

See also
 Bull (disambiguation)
 Bulles, Oise, France